Waymond may refer to:

 Waymond Bryant (born 1952), former American football linebacker
 Waymond C. Huggins (1927–2016), state politician and forest ranger in the state of Georgia
 Hut Stricklin (Waymond Lane Stricklin Jr., born 1961), American former professional stock car racing driver
 Waymond Wang, a fictional character in the 2022 film Everything Everywhere All at Once